Sangu Gas Field is a natural gas field in Bangladesh. It is the only offshore gas field in Bangladesh that is currently abandoned. This gas field was discovered in 1996 in the Bay of Bengal 50km away from the land near Silimpur, Chittagong. Santos, an Australian multinational company was in charge of operation of the gas field. Its production was closed in 2014. To store the imported LNG, the government of Bangladesh is planning to convert the offshore gas field into an underground storage, where 487.91 billion cubic feet of gas can be stored.
Currently in Bangladesh, there are 22 onshore blocks and 26 offshore blocks. Among these offshore blocks, 11 are shallow blocks, where the other 15 are deep sea blocks.

Gas production
In 1998, British oil company Cairn Energy started producing gas from Sangu Gas Field. It initially produces about 50 million cubic feet of gas daily. Later it increased up to 180 million cubic feet a day. Production levels dropped to an average of 49 million daily in 2009, and 18 million cubic feet per day on average in 2011. It was declared abandoned when gas production dropped from two to three million cubic feet daily at the end of the 2013. According to Petrobangla, about 488 billion cubic feet of gas is produced from this gas field from 1998 to 2014.

See also 
List of natural gas fields in Bangladesh
Bangladesh Gas Fields Company Limited
Gas Transmission Company Limited

References 

1996 establishments in Bangladesh
Natural gas fields in Bangladesh